The Royal Navy was responsible for all of British North America, until Canadian Confederation in 1867. After Confederation the Royal Navy increasingly shared naval responsibilities with Canada but retained sole responsibility for other British colonies in North America, until they joined Canada. In 1910, the Department of the Naval Service was created to consolidate all naval services in Canada, receiving royal assent in 1911 to become the Royal Canadian Navy. Within a few years many of the non-military naval services and vessels integrated under the RCN were returned to their original departments. The list of ships of the Royal Canadian Navy contains the surface warships, submarines and auxiliary vessels in service from 1910 up to the early 1990s. This includes all commissioned, non-commissioned, loaned or hired ships in service within the RCN. Ships in this list also include Royal Navy vessels with RCN crews, such as TR-series minesweepers of the First World War, and aircraft carriers of the Second World War.

Commissioned 1910–22 

The Canadian navy was created in 1910 as the Department of the Naval Service. The Naval Service integrated other marine arms of the government of Canada with which it had a common professional background and the objective of security in the Canadian maritime environment and national sovereignty. In addition to a combat capability, the naval service included the Fisheries Protection, Hydrographic Survey, tidal observation and wireless telegraph branches. Each branch, including the quasi-military Fisheries Protection, contributed their fleet of ships to the new Naval Service. The service thereby commanded a number of Canadian Government Ships (CGS) ships in addition to the two purchased Royal Navy warships. Initially, eight fisheries cruisers (under the command of Rear Admiral Charles Kingsmill), were brought into the Department of the Naval Service, including , the first modern warship built in the country.
With the outbreak of the First World War government and commercial vessels were pressed into naval service. Great Britain and Canada planned to significantly expand the RCN but decided that Canadian men could enlist the Royal Navy or the RCN with many choosing the former. Following the demobilization after the war, the RCN undertook many of the civilian responsibilities of the Department of Transport.

Cruisers

  (the RCN's first ship)
  (the RCN's second ship)
 

Destroyers
 
  (Thornycroft M class)

Submarines
 
  (CC class)
  (H class)
  (H class)

Trawlers

 
  (Battle class)
  (Battle class)
  (Battle class)
  (Battle class)
  (Battle class)
  (Battle class)
  (Battle class)
  (Battle class)
  (Battle class)
  (Battle class)
  (Battle class)

Minesweepers

Torpedo boats
  (ex-Tarantula)

Hospital ship
 HMCHS Prince George

Auxiliary and other

Icebreakers
 HMCS Earl Grey
 HMCS Minto
 HMCS Stanley

Training vessels
 HMCS Arthur W

Motor launches

Patrol boats

Survey vessels
 Karluk
 CGS Chrissie C. Thomey
 Gladiator
 CGS La Canadienne
 CGS Mary Sachs
 CGS North Star (III)

Tenders 
 Davy Jones 
 Egret (I)
 Holly Leaf
 Ivy Leaf
 Kipawo
 Laurel Leaf  
 
 Tannis  
 Valiant (I)
 Viking (ex-CGS Viking) 
 Viner

Tugs 
 Alaska (II)
 C.E. Tanner
 Coastguard
 G.S. Mayes
 Gwennith
 Highland Mary (I)
 Ruth (II)
 Shark (ex-Nereid (II))
 Trusty
 M.W. Weatherspoon
 C. Wilfred

Other 
 CGS Alaska
 Berthier (examination vessel)
 Speedy (II) (examination vessel)
 HMCS Gate Vessel 3 (ex-W.H. Lee)
 HMCS Gopher (auxiliary minesweeper)
 HMCS Musquash (auxiliary minesweeper)
  (cruiser, third class) 
 Falcon
 
  (depot ship)
 Ruth (I)
 Ruth (IV)
 Scotsman

Commissioned 1922–47

The Department of the Naval Service was replaced in 1922 by the Department of National Defence. The Fisheries Protection, Hydrographic Survey, tidal observation and wireless telegraph branches, along with many ships, were transferred to other government departments and delisted by the RCN. While a large "Fisherman's Reserve" was formed in 1938, at the outbreak of the Second World War, the RCN had been reduced to six River-class destroyers, five minesweepers, two small training vessels bases at Halifax and Victoria, 145 officers and 1,674 seamen. The RCN expanded rapidly during the Second World War, with vessels transferred or purchased from the Royal Navy and US Navy and the construction of many vessels in Canada, such as corvettes and frigates. The RCN ended the war with a fleet of approximately 950 ships, the third-largest navy in the world and an operational reach extending into the Atlantic, Pacific, Caribbean and Mediterranean. Due to the terms of the Lend Lease agreements between the United States and the United Kingdom, a few of the US built vessels that were crewed by the RCN remained under the "HMS" designation of the Royal Navy (RN); the two "HMS" aircraft carriers were mixed crews, as the RCN crewed the ship, while the air crews were provided by the RN's Fleet Air Arm.

Aircraft carriers

 
  (Ruler class)

Cruisers

Light cruisers
  (later renamed )
 

Armed merchant cruisers 
 
  (Prince class)
  (Prince class)

Destroyers

*(US Navy Wickes and Clemson-class vessels commissioned into the Royal Navy as Town class, and later loaned to the RCN. Some also commissioned into the RCN.)

Frigates

Corvettes

Submarines
  (surrendered and recommissioned U-boat)
  (surrendered and recommissioned U-boat)

Minesweepers

Motor launches

*(Canadian Fairmiles were not commissioned. They were not named, until sold off, or assigned as tenders to various bases post-war. Ships loaned to Free French Navy (FFN) served under Canadian command.)

Motor torpedo boats 

 HMCS CMTB-1
 "S-03" (ex USN PT-3)
 "S-04" (ex USN PT-4)
 "S-05" (ex USN PT-5)
 "S-06" (ex USN PT-6)
 "S-07" (ex USN PT-7)
 HMCS S-09 (ex USN PT-9)
 MTB 459 (G type)
 MTB 460 (G type)
 MTB 461 (G type)
 MTB 462 (G type)
 MTB 463 (G type)
 MTB 464 (G type)
 MTB 465 (G type)
 MTB 466 (G type)
 MTB 485 (G type)
 MTB 486 (G type)
 MTB 491 (G type)
 MTB 726 (Fairmile D type)
 MTB 727 (Fairmile D type)
 MTB 735 (Fairmile D type)
 MTB 736 (Fairmile D type)
 MTB 743 (Fairmile D type)
 MTB 744 (Fairmile D type)
 MTB 745 (Fairmile D type)
 MTB 746 (Fairmile D type)
 MTB 747 (Fairmile D type)
 MTB 748 (Fairmile D type)
 MTB 797 (Fairmile D type)

Armed trawlers and yachts

Armed trawlers

 
  (Isles class)
  (Isles class)
  (Isles class)
  (Isles class)
  (Isles class)
  (Isles class)
  (Isles class)

Armed yachts

  (Q11/Z32)
  (S10/Z10) (ex-Aztec)
  (ex-Elfreda)
  (ex-USS Sabalo)
  (ex-Arcadia)
 
 
 
 
 
  (S14), (ex-Halonia)
  (ex-Mascotte)
  (ex-Winchester (II))
  (Z02)

Landing craft 

 LCI (L) 115
 LCI (L) 117
 LCI (L) 118
 LCI (L) 121
 LCI (L) 125
 LCI (L) 135
 LCI (L) 166
 LCI (L) 177
 LCI (L) 249
 LCI (L) 250
 LCI (L) 252
 LCI (L) 255
 LCI (L) 260
 LCI (L) 262
 LCI (L) 263
 LCI (L) 264
 LCI (L) 266
 LCI (L) 270
 LCI (L) 271
 LCI (L) 276
 LCI (L) 277
 LCI (L) 285
 LCI (L) 288
 LCI (L) 295
 LCI (L) 298
 LCI (L) 299
 LCI (L) 301
 LCI (L) 302
 LCI (L) 305
 LCI (L) 306
 LCI (L) 310
 LCI (L) 311
 LCA 736
 LCA 850
 LCA 856
 LCA 925
 LCA 1021
 LCA 1033
 LCA 1057
 LCA 1059
 LCA 1137
 LCA 1138
 LCA 1150
 LCA 1151
 LCA 1371
 LCA 1372
 LCA 1374
 LCA 1375

Auxiliaries

Accommodation vessels

Anti-submarine target towing vessels
 CNAV Atwood (Z 47)
 CNAV Brentwood (Z 48)
 CNAV Eastwood (Z 49)
 CNAV Greenwood (Z 50)
 CNAV  Inglewood (Z 51)
 CNAV  Kirkwood (Z 53)
 CNAV Lakewood (Z 63)
 CNAV  Oakwood (Z 64)
 CNAV  Wildwood (Z 65)

Auxiliary minesweepers
  (TR 18/J06)
 HMCS Cape Beale (Fy 26)
 HMCS Joan W. II (Fy 34)
 HMCS Mitchell Bay (Fy 05)
  (J13/J11/Z11)
  (Z33/J08)
 HMCS Signal (Fy 30)
  (Z16/J00) 
 HMCS Suderoy I
 HMCS Suderoy II
 HMCS Suderoy IV (J03)
 HMCS Suderoy V (Z04)
 HMCS Suderoy VI (J05)
 HMCS Takla (Fy 27)
  (J11/Z21)
 HMCS Vercheres

Cable layers
 HMCS Cyrus Field

Diving vessels
 Diving Tender No 2
 Diving Tender No 3
 Diving Tender No 4
 Diving Tender No 5
 Diving Tender No 6

Examination vessels
  (Z03/W03)
 HMCS Citadelle
 HMCS French (S01/Z23)
  (Z31/J16)
 HMCS Laurier (S09/Z34)
  (W07/Z38)
  (Z44)
  (Fy 93/Z02/Z24)
  (Z19/J19)
  (Z39)
 HMCS Ulna
 HMCS Zoarces (Fy 62/Z36)

Gate vessels
 GV 1 (ex-)
 GV 2
 GV 3
 GV 4
 GV 5
 GV 6
 GV 7
 GV 8
 GV 9
 GV 10
 GV 11
 GV 12 (ex-)
 GV 13
 GV 14 (ex-)
 GV 15 (ex-)
 GV 16 (ex-)
 GV 17 (ex-)
 GV 18
 GV 19
 GV 20 (ex- CD 101)
 GV 21
 GV 22
 GV 23
 GV 24

Mine laying vessels
 
  (M03/M53)

Mobile deperming crafts
 HMCS Gryme (Z60)
  (Z09/J01/J09)

Patrol boats
 HMCS Adversus (J17)
  (Z18/J18)
 HMCS Allaverdy (Fy 06)
 HMCS Andamara (Z 22)
 HMCS Anna Mildred (Fy 87/Z12A)
 Bantie (W 04)
 HMCS Barkely Sound (Fy23) 
 HMCS Barmar (Fy 10/Z115)
 Bartlett
 HMCS B.C. Lady (Fy 07, later to RCAF)
 HMCS Billow (Fy 25), ex-(Fy 32)
 HMCS Camenita (Fy 41)
 HMCS Cancolim  (Z10)
 HMCS Canfisco (Fy 17)
 HMCS Capella (Fy 31)
 HMCS Chamiss Bay (Fy 39/F50)
 HMCS Cleopatra (Fy 89/Z35)
 HMCS Combat (later to RCAF)
 HMCS Comber (Fy 37) (ex-C.S.C. II)
 HMCS Crest (Fy 38) (ex-May S)
 HMCS Dalehurst (Fy 35) (ex-Glendale V)
 HMCS Departure Bay (Fy 48)
 HMCS Earl Field (Fy 40)
 HMCS Ehkoli (Fy 12)
 HMCS Eileen
 HMCS Fifer (Fy 00/Z30)
 HMCS Interceptor (Z15)
 HMCS Howe Sound I (Fy 19)
 HMCS Johanna (Fy 28)
 HMCS Kuitan (Fy 14)
 HMCS Leola Vivien (Fy 15, also called Leelo)
 HMCS Lil II
 HMCS Louis Herbert (Fy 92/J22)
 HMCS Loyal I (Fy 43)
 HMCS Loyal II (Fy 22/Z25) (ex-Foam)
 HMCS Maraudor (Fy 03)
 HMCS Margaret I (Fy 29)
 HMCS Meander (Z04)
 HMCS Merry Chase (Fy 46)
 HMCS Moolock (Fy 16)
 HMCS Moresby III (Fy 42)
 HMCS Nenamook (Fy 13)
 HMCS San Tomas (Fy 02)
 HMCS Santa Maria (Fy 08)
 HMCS Smith Sound (Fy 18)
 HMCS Snow Prince (later to RCAF)
 HMCS Spray (Fy 33/Z09) (ex-Hatta VII)
 HMCS Springtime V (Fy 09)
 HMCS Starling (II)
 HMCS Surf (Fy 24) (ex-Arashio)
 HMCS Talapus (Fy 11)
 HMCS Tordo| (Fy 20)
 HMCS Valdes (Fy 21)
 HMCS Vanisle (Fy 01)
  (Z21)
 HMCS West Coast (Fy 04)
 HMCS Western Maid (Fy 36)

Support ships
  (Z40)
  (Z41) (Dun class)
  (Z56)
  (Z57)
  (F94)
  (F100)
 HMCS Westore

Survey vessels

Tankers
 
  (Z43/J43)
 
  (Z42)

Tenders
 HMCS Chief Seagay
 HMCS Chief Tapeet
 HMCS "Crusader"

Training vessels
 HMCS Attaboy
 HMCS Cairn
 HMCS Donnaconna II
 HMCS Milicette
 
 HMCS Pathfinder
 HMCS Scatari
 HMCS Shirl
 
 HMCS St. Clair
 HMCS Venetia 
  (later HC 190)

W/T Calibration vessels
 HMCS Aristocrat (Z46)
 HMCS Seretha II (Fy 45/Z45)

Other
 HMCS Kipawa (BMV)
  (Z17/J10) (CS Tow)
 HMCS Anashene
 HMCS Andrew Lee
 HMCS Andy (II)
 
  (ex-HMCS Charny)
 HMCS Lady Rodney (Fy 46/F40)
  (P07/Z07)
 HMCS Madawaska
 HMCS Magedoma
  (P03/Z03)
  (P12/Z12)
 
  (J12)

(The symbol FY in the pennant number denotes fishing vessels of the Fisherman's Reserve which comprised a large portion of the auxiliary fleet throughout the Second World War.)

Tugboats

Harbour craft

Commissioned 1948–89

As the Second World War drew to a close the RCN stopped its rapid expansion and dramatically reduced its military expenditures. This resulted in a significant reduction in personnel and ships by 1947. A planned transfer of two light aircraft carriers from the Royal Navy, HMCS Warrior and HMCS Magnificent was slowed, and Warrior eventually returned. With the emergence of the Cold War and the formation of the North Atlantic Treaty Organization, followed by the outbreak of the Korean War, the Canadian government increased military spending. The RCN recommissioned and modified Second World War ships held in reserve, launched new classes of ships, and upgraded its aviation capabilities. In 1968, the RCN was amalgamated with the Royal Canadian Air Force and Canadian Army to form the unified Canadian Forces.  All personnel, ships, and aircraft became part of Maritime Command (MARCOM), as an element of the Canadian Armed Forces.

Aircraft carriers
 
  (Majestic class)
  (Colossus class)

Destroyers
 

Destroyer escorts

  (II)
  (II)
 
  (II)
 
  (II)
  (II)
  (II)
  (II)
  (II)
  (II)
  (II)
 
  (II)
  (II)
  (II)
  (III)
  (II)
  (II)
  (II)

Submarines
  (II)
 
 
 
  (II)

Minesweepers

  (I)
  (II)
  (II)
  (III)
  (II)
  (II)
  (III)
 
  (II)
  (III)
  (II)
 
  (II)
  (III)
  (II)
 
  (II)
  (III)
 
  (II)

Patrol vessels

  (Detachment class)
  (II)
  (II)
  (Bird class)
  (Bird)
  (I) (Bird)
  (Bird)
  (Bird)
  (Bird)
  (Bird)
  (Bird)
 
  (Racer)
 
  (ex-Black Duck (RCAF))

Auxiliary

Auxiliary minesweeping
  (II)
  (III)
 

Diving support ship
  (II)

Escort maintenance ships
 

Fireboats
  (YTR 561)
  (YTR 562)

Gate vessels
 

High speed launch vessels
 HSL-208 (ex-RCMP M208)
 HSL-231 (ex-RCMP M231)
 HSL-232 (ex-RCMP M232)
 HSL-233 (ex-RCMP M233)
 HSL-234 (ex-RCMP M234)
 HSL-235 (ex-RCMP M235)

Hydrofoil prototype
 , ex- (I)
  (II)

Icebreaker
 

Survey ships
  (AGOR 114)
  (AGOR 171) (Endeavour class)
  (AGOR 172)

Replenishment oilers
 
 
 

Tugboats
 
 
 
 
 
  
 
 
 
 
  

Training vessels
 , ex-ML Q106) (II)

Utility and other boats
 
 
 
 
 
 
 
 
 
 
 CFAV Pelican (YAG 4)
 CFAV Blackduck (YAG 660)
 CFAV Albatross (YAG 661)
 CFAV Gemini (YAG 650)
 CFAV Pegasus (YAG 651)

Yard diving tenders
 CFAV Granby (YDT 12)
 CFAV Raccoon (YDT 10)
 Unnamed (YDT 11)

Submarine non-operational
 ex- – training ship
 ex- – stripped for parts in UK

Commissioned 1990 to present

See also
 Royal Canadian Navy
 Origins of the Royal Canadian Navy
 History of the Royal Canadian Navy
 Hull classification symbol (Canada)
 His Majesty's Canadian Ship
 List of aircraft of the Royal Canadian Navy
 Fleet of the Royal Canadian Navy
Naval vessels of Canada prior to 1910, and other British North American colonies
 Royal Navy
 Royal Newfoundland Constabulary
 Provincial Marine

Naval vessels of other Canadian government departments
 Fisheries Canada
 Coast Guard
 RCMP
 Canadian Hydrographic Service

Naval vessels of other British imperial and commercial entities in North America
 Hudson's Bay Company
 Sea Fencibles

Notes

References

Bibliography and further reading

See also

 

 01
Royal Canadian Navy
.Ships
Royal Canadian Navy Ships
Royal Canadian Navy List
Royal Canadian Navy Ships
.Royal Canadian Navy
Royal Canadian Navy ships